Jon L. Wanzek (born May 10, 1964) is a film producer and philanthropist. He currently runs Bad Medicine Films and produced Valley of Bones. He is the former President and Owner of Wanzek Construction.

Early career
Wanzek received a degree in Civil Engineering from the University of Minnesota at Minneapolis in 1986. After various jobs, he returned to his parents company Wanzek Construction, Inc as a project engineer, eventually becoming president and CEO of the family business.

Business Enterprises 
After the sale of Wanzek Construction, Inc., Wanzek continued entrepreneurial endeavors, including: investments in local businesses such as Bushel (an agricultural technology company) and DogIDs, food safety technology (Napasol North America), ranching (Pitchfork Ranch LLC), real estate acquisition including the Meadowlark Building in downtown Fargo, and movie production (Bad Medicine Films).

Film career 
A North Dakota-based, independent film production company, Bad Medicine Films was established by Wanzek in 2012 and is named after his cabin and lake property on Bad Medicine Lake in Minnesota.
His first project was in 2015 when Wanzek was the Executive Producer on the movie Ten Thousand Saints, a film based on a novel by Eleanor Henderson. The movie premiered at the Sundance Film Festival in 2015.
 
That same year, Wanzek produced and developed a script for Valley of Bones, his first full independent feature film. Most of the film was shot on Wanzek's Pitchfork Ranch property near Amidon, North Dakota. Valley of Bones was distributed by Smith Global Media/Sony Pictures and released across the United States in September 2017.
 
In 2019, Wanzek produced Human Capital, a remake of the 2013 Italian film of the same name, which was based on the novel by Stephen Amidon. The film premiered at the Toronto Film Festival on September 6, 2019.

Philanthropy
Since 2009, Wanzek, through the Wanzek Family Foundation, has supported many charities. Some of the organizations he has supported include the YMCA, Mayo Clinic, Cross Catholic Outreach, Theodore Roosevelt Medora Foundation.

Filmography

References

External links
Jon Wanzek on JonWanzek.com

American film producers
American screenwriters
1964 births
Living people